Toni Arthur-Hay (born Antoinette Alice Priscilla Wilson; 27 December 1940) is an English theatre director, former folk singer and television presenter.

Early life and education
Arthur was born in Oxford, England. She describes her childhood as "lovely, working class, dead ordinary". At the age of nine, she won a scholarship to the Royal Academy of Music, and gave a concert at the Wigmore Hall in the same year. She was educated at Mary Datchelor Girls School in Camberwell and the Royal Academy of Music.

In 1959, Toni Arthur went to University College Hospital to become a nurse, and then went on to start a degree in psychology at University College London.

Career

Television
Arthur is most remembered as one of the presenters of the children's programmes Play School and Play Away with Brian Cant and Lionel Morton. She also presented Woman's Hour, TV-am's breakfast show and many other programmes.

In 2010, Arthur criticised modern children's TV programmes and called for gentler programmes to allow toddlers to build up reassuring relationships with presenters.

Music
After releasing their first single, the traditional songs "The Cuckoo" / "A Rich and Rambling Boy", under the name The Strollers on Fontana Records (TF 598) in July 1965, Toni released several folk music albums in the late 1960s and early 1970s with her then-husband, Dave Arthur. These included Morning Stands on Tiptoe (1967), The Lark in the Morning (1969) and Hearken to the Witches Rune (1971). With her husband, she recalls travelling the world, singing in folk clubs.

Hearken to the Witches Rune was released on the red Trailer label in the UK in 1971. The tracklist is as follows: "Alison Gross", "Tam Lin", "A Fairy Tale", "The Fairy Child", "Broomfield Hill", "The Standing Stones", "The Cruel Mother", and "Alice Brand". All are traditional songs. Some copies of this album came with a 'Magic in Ballads' booklet.

It was while Arthur was performing in a folk club, she has said, that a BBC producer approached her about auditioning for a children's BBC programme called Play School. She gained the job, even though, she says she was wearing "an incredibly short skirt."

Arthur also appeared on a BBC album that was a spin off from the BBC children's programme Play Away in 1977. Ready Steady Go – Play Away was full of songs in the Music Hall style. She appeared as a solo artist on tracks such as "Doctor Foster Tours The World", "Running, Stretching, Racing", "Why Does The Winkle Always Turn to the Right?" and "Night Express North Bound". She also performed many ensemble songs with Brian Cant, while Jonathan Cohen, Spike Heatley and Alan Rushton (who had all played at Ronnie Scott's) formed a tight band. Brian and Toni weave a "night on the town" narrative in and out of the songs about Music Hall, coffee bars and gambling. The back cover of the album sleeve also featured a board game.

Books
Arthur has written several plays and books, including All The Year Round – A Compendium of Games, Customs and Stories, which was a children's book of crafts for celebrating the seasons. This was published by Puffin Books on 27 August 1981, .

Theatre
In 2003, Arthur directed A Very Naughty Boy by Adrian Poynton, based on the life of Graham Chapman. It won a first prize at the Edinburgh Festival Fringe.

Personal life
Arthur married the singer and storyteller Dave Arthur in 1963, and they had two children Jonathan and Tim. They separated in 1977.

She married the former Time Out Magazine comedy editor Malcolm Hay in 1996.

Her younger son Tim was formerly editor-in-chief and CEO of Time Out, and is currently a radio presenter on BBC Radio London.

In 2000, Toni Arthur appeared on a programme called Mystic Challenge, and spoke about her relationship with Buddhism. "I started reading about Buddhism, and found that that philosophy of knowing yourself before you know others, suited me, and I have been a Buddhist ever since."

References

External links

Toni Arthur biography
Toni Arthur at the Edinburgh Festival Fringe
Life after Big Ted

1941 births
Living people
BBC television presenters
BBC Radio 4 presenters
British children's television presenters
English women singers
English folk singers
English television presenters
English theatre directors
People educated at Mary Datchelor School
People from Oxford
Transatlantic Records artists
British women television presenters
Topic Records artists